The volcano system in Iceland that started activity on August 17, 2014, and ended on February 27, 2015, is Bárðarbunga.
The volcano in Iceland that erupted in May 2011 is Grímsvötn.

Iceland experiences frequent volcanic activity, due to its location both on the Mid-Atlantic Ridge, a divergent tectonic plate boundary, and over a hot spot. Nearly thirty volcanoes are known to have erupted in the Holocene epoch; these include Eldgjá, source of the largest lava eruption in human history.

Volcanic systems and volcanic zones of Iceland
Holocene volcanism in Iceland is mostly to be found in the Neovolcanic Zone, comprising the Reykjanes Volcanic Belt (RVB), the West Volcanic Zone (WVZ), the Mid-Iceland Belt (MIB), the East Volcanic Zone (EVZ) and the North Volcanic Zone (NVZ). Two lateral volcanic zones play a minor role: Öræfi Volcanic Belt (ÖVB) and Snæfellsnes Volcanic Belt (SVB). Outside of the main island are the Reykjanes Ridge (RR), as part of the Mid-Atlantic Ridge to the southwest and the Kolbeinsey Ridge (KR) to the north. Two transform zones are connecting these volcano-tectonic zones: the South Iceland Seismic Zone (SISZ) in the south of Iceland and the Tjörnes Transform Zone (TFZ) in the north.

The island has around 30 active volcanic systems, comprising each volcano-tectonic fissure systems and many of them also a central volcano (mostly in the form of a stratovolcano, sometimes of a shield volcano with a magma chamber underneath). Thirteen volcanic systems have hosted eruptions since the settlement of Iceland in AD 874.

Of these 30 active volcanic systems, the most active is Grímsvötn.  Over the past 500 years, Iceland's volcanoes have produced a third of the total global lava output.

Important eruptions
See also : List of volcanic eruptions in Iceland

Hekla
Hekla has erupted more than 20 times in recorded history.  It was known to medieval Europeans as the Gate of Hell; that reputation persisted into the 19th century.

Laki/Skaftáreldar 1783-84
The most deadly volcanic eruption of Iceland's history was the so-called Skaftáreldar (fires of Skaftá) in 1783. The eruption was in the crater row Lakagígar (craters of Laki) southwest of Vatnajökull glacier. The craters are a part of a larger volcanic system with the subglacial Grímsvötn as a central volcano. Roughly a quarter of the Icelandic population died because of the eruption. Most died not because of the lava flow or other direct effects of the eruption but from indirect effects, including changes in climate and illnesses in livestock in the following years caused by the ash and poisonous gases from the eruption. The eruption is thought to have erupted the largest quantity of lava from a single eruption in historic times.

Eldfell 1973
The eruption happened without warning, causing the island's population of about 5,300 people to evacuate on fishing boats within a few hours. Importantly, the progress of lava into the harbour was slowed by manual spraying of seawater. One person died, and the eruption resulted in the destruction of homes and property on the island.

Eyjafjallajökull 2010

The eruption under Eyjafjallajökull in April 2010 caused extreme disruption to air travel across western and northern Europe over a period of six days in April 2010. About 20 countries closed their airspace to commercial jet traffic and it affected approximately 10 million travellers.

The eruption had a VEI of 4, the largest known from Eyjafjallajökull. Several previous eruptions of Eyjafjallajökull have been followed soon afterwards by eruptions of the larger volcano Katla, but after the 2010 eruption, no activity occurred at Katla.

Grímsvötn 2011

The eruption in May 2011 at Grímsvötn under the Vatnajökull glacier sent thousands of tonnes of ash into the sky in a few days, raising concerns of a repeat of the travel chaos seen across northern Europe.

Bárðarbunga 2014–2015

Bárðarbunga is a stratovolcano and is roughly 2,000 metres (roughly 6,560 feet) above sea level in central Iceland. This makes it the second highest mountain in Iceland. Its 2014-2015 eruption was Iceland's largest in 230 years. The eruption started on August 17, 2014 and lasted for 180 days, Following a major earthquake swarm, multiple lava fountain eruptions began in Holuhraun. The lava flow rate was between 250 and 350 cubic metres per second and came from a dyke over 40 km long. An ice-filled subsidence bowl over 100 square kilometres in area and up to 65 metres deep formed as well. There was very limited ash output from this eruption unlike numerous glacial eruptions which are common in Iceland. The primary concern with this eruption was the large plumes of sulphur dioxide (SO2) in the atmosphere which adversely affected breathing conditions across Iceland, depending on wind direction. The volcanic cloud was also transported toward Western Europe in September 2014.

Fagradalsfjall 2021

Following a three-week period of increased seismic activity, an eruption fissure developed near Fagradalsfjall, a mountain on the Reykjanes Peninsula.  Lava flow from a 200-meter fissure was first discovered by an Icelandic Coast Guard helicopter on March 19, 2021 in the Geldingadalur area near Grindavík, and within hours the fissure had grown to 500 meters in length.

Structure of lava fields

The smooth flowing basaltic lava pāhoehoe is known in Icelandic as helluhraun . It forms smooth surfaces that are quite easy to cross. More viscous lava forms ʻaʻā flows, known in Icelandic as apalhraun . The loose, broken, sharp, spiny surface of an ʻaʻā flow makes hiking across it difficult and slow.

See also

 Geography of Iceland
 Geology of Iceland
 List of volcanoes in Iceland
 List of volcanic eruptions in Iceland''
 Geothermal power in Iceland
 Geology of Reykjanes Peninsula
 Surtsey
 Lists of volcanoes

References

External links
Photos of the Grímsvötn (2004) and Eyjafjallajökull (2010) eruptions (Fred Kamphues)
Map: active volcanoes of the world
Icelandic Video Archive
Volcano Discovery: Iceland
 List of volcanic eruptions in Iceland since 1900, Icelandic Met Office

 

de:Vulkane in Island